Almanon is a lunar impact crater that lies in the rugged highlands in the south-central region of the Moon. It was named after Abbasid Caliph and astronomer Al-Ma'mun. It is located to the south-southeast of Abulfeda, and to the north-northeast of the smaller crater Geber. The crater chain designated Catena Abulfeda forms a line between the south rim of Abulfeda and the north rim of Almanon, continuing for a length of about 210 kilometers to the Rupes Altai scarp.

The rim of Almanon forms a slightly distorted circle, with outward bulges to the north and southwest. The crater pair Almanon A and Almanon B is attached to the exterior of the southern rim. The interior wall is wider along the eastern side than elsewhere. Small craters belonging to the Catena Abulfeda intrude slightly into the northeast rim. The outer wall is generally worn and lacks the crispness of a younger crater, but is not significantly impacted by subsequent cratering. The interior floor is relatively flat and lacks notable features other than a few tiny craterlets.

Satellite craters
By convention these features are identified on lunar maps by placing the letter on the side of the crater midpoint that is closest to Almanon.

References

External links

Almanon at The Moon Wiki

Impact craters on the Moon